Calliergonella is a genus of mosses belonging to the family Pylaisiaceae.

The genus was first described by Loeske.

The genus has cosmopolitan distribution.

Species:
 Calliergonella cuspidata
 Calliergonella lindbergii

References

Hypnales
Moss genera